Gomorra is an EP written and recorded by German electro-industrial musician Wumpscut.

Track listing
 "Untermensch (Adored Version)" - 4:27	
 "In the Night (Full Range Track)" - 5:16	
 "Crucified Division (Desert Mixx)" - 3:57	
 "Turns Off Pain (Recommended Version)" - 6:04	
 "Untitled" - 0:33

References

1994 EPs
Metropolis Records EPs
Wumpscut albums